Saratoga is an unincorporated community and census-designated place (CDP) in Hempstead and Howard counties, Arkansas, United States. Per the 2020 census, the population was 124.

Saratoga has a post office with ZIP code 71859.

Residents are served by the Mineral Springs Saratoga School District. On July 1, 2004, the Saratoga School District consolidated into the Mineral Springs School District. The local high school is currently Mineral Springs High School; the district previously operated Saratoga High School until its 2012 closure.

Demographics

2020 census

Note: the US Census treats Hispanic/Latino as an ethnic category. This table excludes Latinos from the racial categories and assigns them to a separate category. Hispanics/Latinos can be of any race.

References

Unincorporated communities in Hempstead County, Arkansas
Unincorporated communities in Howard County, Arkansas
Unincorporated communities in Arkansas
Arkansas placenames of Native American origin
Census-designated places in Hempstead County, Arkansas
Census-designated places in Howard County, Arkansas